The 1994 Kazakhstan Cup was the third season of the Kazakhstan Cup, the annual nationwide football cup competition of Kazakhstan since the independence of the country. The competition began on 31 May 1994, and ended with the final in November 1994. Dostyk were the defending champions, having won their first cup in the 1993 competition.

First round

Second round

Quarter-finals

Semi-finals

Final

References

Kazakhstan Cup seasons
1994 domestic association football cups
Cup